The Battle of Passo Fundo was a military engagement fought between forces of the First Brazilian Republic and various military units affiliated with the Federalist Revolution. The battle, which was fought on 27 June 1894 along the Passo Fundo River (in the state of Rio Grande do Sul), was the largest battle of the Federalist Revolution. It ended in a victory for the Brazilian Republic.

References

Citations

Bibliography 
 
 
 

1894 in Brazil
Passo Fundo
Passo Fundo